The 2020 Townsville Fire season was the 20th season for the franchise in the Women's National Basketball League (WNBL).

James Cook University remain as the Fire's naming rights partner after signing a three-year extension in September 2019. The Fire announced a different leadership team for this season, with Kate Gaze, Mia Murray, Lauren Nicholson & Nadeen Payne acting as a leadership group rather than a captaincy.

Due to the COVID-19 pandemic, a North Queensland hub is set to host the season. The season was originally 2020–21 and would be traditionally played over several months across the summer, however this seasons scheduling has been condensed. The six-week season will see Townsville, Cairns and Mackay host a 56-game regular season fixture, plus a four game final series (2 x semi-finals, preliminary final and grand final).

Roster

Standings

Results

Regular season

Finals

References

External links
Townsville Fire Official website

2020 WNBL season
WNBL seasons by team
Basketball,Townsville Fire
2020 in basketball
Australia,Townsville Fire
2020–21 in Australian basketball